Auckland One Rail is a train operator that commenced operating services under contract to Auckland Transport in January 2022. It is a 50/50 joint venture owned by Singapore-based ComfortDelGro and Australian-based UGL Rail. The operation is the first overseas heavy rail venture by a Singapore company, as well as ComfortDelGro's first in New Zealand.

History

On 27 August 2021, Auckland One Rail (AOR) was awarded an eight-year contract by Auckland Transport to operate the Auckland suburban rail network, beating a consortium of Transdev, John Holland and CAF. It took over from Transdev Auckland on 16 January 2022. The contract is worth around $NZ 130m/yr over an initial 8-year term, and the venture will take over responsibility for train maintenance from 2025.

References

ComfortDelGro companies
Rail transport in Auckland
Railway companies established in 2022
Railway companies of New Zealand
New Zealand companies established in 2022
Organisations based in Auckland